Edmé Quenedey des Ricets (sometimes Edmé Quenedey) (born Riceys-le-Haut, December 17, 1756 – died Paris, February 16, 1830) was a French painter and engraver, known most especially for his miniatures.  One of a family of eight children, he was initially destined for the priesthood, but studied instead at Dijon; he began his career as a restorer of pictures. Upon the invention of the physionotrace by Gilles-Louis Chrétien they cooperated for making portraits. In 1789 he began for himself. With his wife, Marie-Madeleine Pella, he had two children, Adèle and Aglaë; the latter later became an assistant to his father.

References
René Hennequin: Edme Quenedey des Riceys (Aube): portraitiste au physionotrace : un "photographe" de l'Époque de la Révolution et de l'Empire, Société Académique de l'Aube, 1926.

1756 births
1830 deaths
People from Aube
18th-century engravers
19th-century engravers
French engravers
18th-century French painters
French male painters
19th-century French painters
Portrait miniaturists
19th-century French male artists
18th-century French male artists